Sukaria is an 8 km wide caldera to the northeast of Mount Iya on Flores, Indonesia. The southern caldera wall is irregular and a small fumarolic area is found in the western flanks which contains several vents and eject geyser-like water column. No historical records of its activity are available from this volcanic caldera.

See also 

 List of volcanoes in Indonesia

References 

Sukaria
Sukaria
Sukaria